Pavel Makhanovsky (born September 2, 1993) is a Russian professional ice hockey player. He is currently under contract with Amur Khabarovsk of the Kontinental Hockey League (KHL).

Makhanovsky made his Kontinental Hockey League (KHL) debut playing with Avangard Omsk during the 2013–14 KHL season.

References

External links

1993 births
Living people
Admiral Vladivostok players
Amur Khabarovsk players
Avangard Omsk players
Russian ice hockey right wingers
HC Yugra players